Kotch is a 1971 American comedy-drama film directed by Jack Lemmon and starring Walter Matthau, Deborah Winters, Felicia Farr, Charles Aidman, and Ellen Geer.

Adapted by John Paxton from Katharine Topkins' 1965 novel of the same title, the film tells the story of an elderly man who leaves his family rather than going to a nursing home, and strikes up a friendship with a pregnant teenage girl. It was Lemmon's only film behind the camera and partnered him with friend and frequent co-star Matthau.

Portions of the film were shot and set in Palm Springs, California.

Cast

Walter Matthau as Joseph P. Kotcher
Deborah Winters as Erica Herzenstiel
Felicia Farr as Wilma Kotcher
Charles Aidman as Gerald Kotcher
Ellen Geer as Vera Kotcher
Donald and Dean Kowalski as Duncan Kotcher
Arlen Stuart as Mrs. Fisher
Jane Connell as Miss Roberts
James E. Brodhead as Mr. Weaver
Jessica Rains as Dr. McKernan
Darrell Larson as Vincent Perrin
Biff Elliot as Motel Manager
Paul Picerni as Dr. Ramon Caudillo
Lucy Saroyan as Sissy
Kim Hamilton as Emma Daly
Amzie Strickland as Nurse Barons
Larry Linville as Peter Stiel
Penny Santon as Mrs. Segura
Jack Lemmon as Sleeping Bus Passenger (uncredited)

Reception
The film earned rentals of $3.6 million in North America and $1.4 million in other countries. It recorded an overall profit of $330,000.

Roger Ebert of the Chicago Sun-Times gave the film two out of four stars, and said "There aren't many comic actors I admire more than Matthau, and he does his best to be an old man in Kotch, but the illusion simply isn't there." On Rotten Tomatoes, the film has an aggregate score of 75% based on 6 positive and 2 negative critic reviews.

Plot synopsis

Awards and nominations

Home media
Kotch was released in a Region 1 DVD by 20th Century Fox Home Entertainment on July 6, 2004.

See also
 List of American films of 1971

Explanatory notes

References

External links
 
 
 
 

1971 films
1971 comedy-drama films
1971 directorial debut films
ABC Motion Pictures films
American comedy-drama films
Cinerama Releasing Corporation films
Films about old age
Films based on American novels
Films scored by Marvin Hamlisch
Films set in California
Films shot in California
Teenage pregnancy in film
1970s English-language films
1970s American films
English-language comedy-drama films